Tomasha is a rural locality (a village) in Nikolskoye Rural Settlement, Kaduysky District, Vologda Oblast, Russia. The population was 1 as of 2002.

Geography 
Tomasha is located 32 km northeast of Kaduy (the district's administrative centre) by road. Pelemen is the nearest rural locality.

References 

Rural localities in Kaduysky District